"Yarmouth Town" is a traditional English song. It is a shanty about the town of Great Yarmouth on the Norfolk coast. It recounts a story of a young woman, the daughter of a pub landlord, who takes many lovers amongst the sailors passing through the port.

It has been performed by a number of musicians including The Clancy Brothers, Planxty, Gaelic Storm, Great Big Sea, and Bellowhead.

Cover versions 
Planxty published "Yarmouth Town" as a B side to "Cliffs of Dooneen" (1972)
Great Big Sea on their album Sea of No Cares (2002)
Bellowhead on their album  Hedonism (2010) og Hedonism Live (2011)
Jon Boden from Bellowhead recorded the song in August 2010 as a part of the project A Folk Song A Day where he recorded and released a folk song each day for one year.
Nic Jones on his live album Unearthed (2011)
Gaelic Storm on their album The Boathouse (2013)

References 

English songs
Year of song unknown
Sea shanties
Songwriter unknown